104.8 Channel 4 FM is the first English-language radio station in the United Arab Emirates. It launched on 1 June 1997 and plays music for a target audience of 18-34 year olds.
 
On 1 June 2017, Channel 4 FM celebrated its 20th anniversary.

Mass media in Dubai
Radio stations established in 1997
Radio stations in the United Arab Emirates
Rhythmic contemporary radio stations